is a member of the Japanese Communist Party, former serving in the House of Representatives.

He was born in the center of the Osaka (the second largest metropolitan area in Japan) in 1972. He graduated from Shumiyoshi High School, and Kobe University in 1991.

He was elected to this position in 2014, representing the Kinki region. Horiuchi is critical of the Prime Minister of Japan Shinzō Abe's plan to reduce the turnover rate of people giving up their jobs to care for the elderly to zero by improving nursing care as unrealistic. He said that to make Abe's policy work, one would need to increase the wages of those working in nursing care and to give more state funding to facilities.

References

External links 
 堀内照文 日本共産党前衆議院議員 – Official Website

Japanese communists
Japanese Communist Party politicians
Members of the House of Representatives (Japan)
Kobe University alumni
People from Osaka
1972 births
Living people